Bernardino Echeverría Ruiz  (born 12 November 1912 in Cotacachi, Imbabura, Ecuador and died on 6 April 2000 in Quito Ecuador) was a Roman Catholic Cardinal.

Biography
He joined the Franciscan order in 1928, and was ordained in 1937.  He attended the Pontifical University in Rome and obtained a B.A. degree in Philosophy in 1941. Upon graduation he returned to Ecuador and performed many duties for the Franciscan order, started a religious magazine and established houses to care for the poor.

He was appointed Bishop of Ambato in 1949, installed as Archbishop of Guayaquil in 1969 and retired in 1989.

He was a member of the International Academy of Franciscan History and was made a Cardinal by Pope John Paul II in 1994.

He was a member of the Marian Movement of Priests and provided his imprimatur for Father Stefano Gobbi's book: To the Priests, Our Lady's Beloved Sons.

References

External links
Biography at Catholic Pages

1912 births
2000 deaths
People from Cotacachi (city)
Participants in the Second Vatican Council
20th-century Roman Catholic archbishops in Ecuador
Ecuadorian cardinals
Ecuadorian Friars Minor
Franciscan cardinals
Cardinals created by Pope John Paul II
Roman Catholic bishops of Ambato
Roman Catholic archbishops of Guayaquil